The Soviet Union–Pakistan relations (Russian: Союз Советских Социалистических Республик -Пакистан; or USSR-Pakistan relations) refers to historical, political, international, and cultural relationships between the state of Pakistan and the Union of Soviet Socialist Republics (USSR). Establishing cultural and bilateral connections between Moscow and Karachi on May 1, 1948, the relations were succeed and predate the post-Soviet Russo-Pakistan relations (1991–present).

Brief political and territorial history

Cultural relations
According to the historian Muhammad Ahsen Chaudhry, the ancestors of the people of Pakistan (particularly West Pakistan as it was known then) "came from the Soviet Central Asia and brought a full rich Soviet culture with them."

In 1965, Zulfikar Ali Bhutto first paid a state visit to Moscow and brought a great achievement to resolve territorial and political difference between the two countries.  On April 3, 1965, President Ayub Khan paid a first ever state visit to Moscow in a view to established a strong cultural relations with the people of the USSR. Publicly, President Ayub Khan thanked Soviet Premier Alexei Kosygin, and quoted:"Soviet Union is our next door neighbor with which
Pakistan had close friendly connections in the past." During this visit, Zulfikar Ali Bhutto and Andrei Gromyko signed the agreements in the field of trade, economic cooperation and cultural exchange.

As the result of President Khan's visit to the Soviet Union, both countries concluded another agreement for cultural exchanges that was signed on 5 June 1965. This agreement was on the basis of exchange the academicians, scholars, scientists, artists, sportsmen, and also the exchange of music records, radio and television programs. During the signing ceremony of this cultural agreement, S.K. Romonovsky, the Soviet Cultural Minister quoted that "many pacts between two countries would help towards better understanding among the people of Pakistan and the USSR." Finally, on 17 April 1968, Premier Kosygin paid a visit to Pakistan and was welcomed by President Ayub and the Pakistan's civil society members with cordial manner. During his visit Alexi Kosygin said: "that relations between Pakistan and the Soviet Union are very good indeed and we should want more and more to strengthen and better them."

The Soviet Premier's visit in April 1968 was the first of its kind state visit and was of outstanding significance. Kosygin agreed to the granting of aid for a steel mill, a nuclear power plant and also economic aid on a broad range of development projects. Quiet importantly, the first Soviet-Pakistan arms deal was made in 1968, which caused protests from India. During the time of Kosygin's reception, renowned poet Hafeez Jullundhri, sang out a poem, comparing Kosygin's visit to the coming of the dawn, which would bring self-determination and justice to the Kashmiri people. Kosygin enjoyed the amusing poetry, but remained silent on this issue. Alexei Kosygin said:

Trade and Economic relations 

The Soviet Union had been long associated with Pakistan to help built its technical industries and consortium since late 1950s.  In 1950, Soviet Union and Pakistan established the multibillion-dollar worth Pakistan Oilfields (it was known as Pakistan-Soviet Oil Fields). In 1969, the Pakistan Government employed "V/o Tyaz Promexport", a USSR technical consortium, for vertically integrated steel mills in Karachi, Sindh Province.  In 1971, Zulfikar Ali Bhutto succeeded to bring full-scale Soviet investment in this project, and laid the foundations of the steel mills in 1972 with the help of Soviet Union.

In 1980–85, the Soviet direct investment increased from 10% to 15% after officially signing an economic cooperation agreement in 1985.  The overall 1.6% of all Pakistan's exports were accounted in 1981, which increased to 2.5% in 1985. Particularly, the Soviet material exports exceeded the imports in three-fold method in early 1980. Unlike, India, the USSR and Pakistan were able to continue the trade of their preferable machinery and technical goods, whilst also cooperated in agricultural products. However, the Soviet Union maintained its restriction to exploit its military equipment and technology to Pakistan, instead offering an economic package (restrictively based on civilian basis) to Pakistan in 1981. Instead, Pakistan went to secure the arms deal with the United States in 1981, including the acquisition of F-16 fighter jets.

In April 1981, Pakistan and Soviet Union formed a joint private company to start the manufacture of the agriculture tractors, for which Soviet Union offered $20 million US dollars. In November 1981, the Soviet Ambassador to Pakistan, V.S. Smirnov, publicly announced that the USSR was ready to provide the financial and technical assistance to set up the export-oriented industries. In 1983, the USSR agreeably sold components of oil-drilled equipment for the construction of the Multan Heavy Water Reactor (Multan-I). In 1985, with Soviet presence, President Zia-ul-Haq inaugurated the vertically integrated and the largest Steel Mill in the South Asia, the Pakistan Steel Mills in Karachi, on 15 January 1985. This project was completed at a capital cost of Rs.24,700 million; and even as today, the Steel Mills maintains a respected history and great symbol for the relations of USSR and Pakistan.

Cooperation in Energy sector 

In November 1981, the USSR financially funded and solely establishing the Guddo Thermal Power Station, and surprise Pakistan by offering to build a second nuclear power plant in May 1981. On 1 March 1990, the USSR again offered its nuclear deal with Pakistan and officially stated that the Pakistan has to increase its power generation needs and the USSR Ambassador to Pakistan, V.P. Yakunin, quoted that "once the required guarantees are provided, there is no harm in supplying a nuclear power plant to Pakistan."  The Pakistan Production Minister, Shahid Zafar immediately traveled to Moscow for such offer and discussed the issue on a visit; this was followed by Foreign Secretary of Pakistan, Tanveer Ahmad, shortly visiting the country. However, after analyzing the technology, Benazir Bhutto of Pakistan (Prime minister at that time) rebuffed the plan and a made move to secure French deal which also went into cold storage.

Political relations with Left-wing sphere of Pakistan 

As late in 1960s, Zulfikar Ali Bhutto had been determined to oust the United States and the Central Intelligence Agency, and subsequently paid visit to Soviet Union as early in 1974.  Since then, Pakistan Peoples Party had been sympathetic to the Soviet Union, although it never allied with the Soviet Union nor the United States. The Soviet Union had extremely close relations with the Awami National Party (ANP) and the Communist Party of Pakistan.  The Awami National Party, since its inception, has been a staunch and loyal supporter of the Soviet Union. In 1980s, the ANP had strong link that traced back to the Soviet Union and its entire leadership escaped to the Soviet Union and the Democratic Republic of Afghanistan, whilst the third and second leadership took refuge in Afghanistan, the first and top level leadership was given asylum in Moscow and parts of the Soviet Union by the Soviet government.

During the period of 1977–91, the Communist Party of the Soviet Union (CPSU) started its covert political activities through the Awami National Party, many of its senior leadership served Soviets intermediary and advisers. The ANP and the PPP and other leftist entities formed the Movement for the Restoration of Democracy (MRD) that began to resisted Zia's right-wing alliance, who had been supporting the Afghan mujaheddin factions in Soviet Afghanistan. During the most of 1980s, the ANP demanded the end of backing of Afghan mujaheddin and acceptance of Kabul's terms for speedy repatriation. In 1987, calculations completed by Pakistan Institute of Public Opinions (PIPO), around ~66% of party's respondents expressed themselves against Pakistan's continuing support of Afghan mujahideen.

However, the MRD suffered many set backs because of its pro-Leninist stance which was not the "line" of Kremlin at that time.  The events that led the collapse of the Soviet Union shattered Pakistan's left. It almost disappeared, until Benazir Bhutto succeeded to unite the scattered leftists mass, which integrated into the PPP, and turned the radical and pro-Soviet leftists into more Social democracy with the principles of democratic socialism and after the death of Bhutto's daughter it is the PTI chairman imran Khan who is nowadays a leftist social democratic leader and closely allied with pro-China line.

Soviet-Afghan war

Relations between Pakistan and the Soviet Union fell to a low point following the Soviet Union's military involvement in Afghanistan. Pakistan supported the anti-communist and religious extremist Mujahedeen forces who fought to overthrow the communist Afghan Government, which had usurped power in the Saur revolution in 1978, whereas the Soviets, ostensibly to support the communist People's Democratic Party of Afghanistan, entered Afghanistan, staged a coup, killed Hafizullah Amin, and installed Soviet loyalist Babrak Karmal as leader.

Pakistani support for the Mujahideen later brought in the involvement of the United Kingdom, the United States, Saudi Arabia and China's support for the same anti-Soviet cause. Pakistan would receive aid from other Muslim nations, China, and the US in the advent of war by the USSR according to General Zia. American presence in Pakistan as well as anti-Soviet/communist Mujahideen havens resulted in Soviet attempts to bombard targets in Pakistan by air that were seen as a threat to the security of Soviet forces in Afghanistan. Some of these resulted in air to air skirmishes between the Soviet Air Force and the Pakistan Air Force (PAF).

Pakistan personalities with Soviet Honors 

Faiz Ahmed Faiz—Lenin Peace Prize (1962)
Abdul Sattar Edhi—Lenin Peace Prize  (1988)
Abdus Salam—Lomonosov Gold Medal (1983)

Soviet personalities with Pakistan honors 
Anna Molka—  Tamgha-i-Imtiaz (1963) and Pride of Performance (1969)
Mikhail Koltokof— Pride of Performance (1987)

Scholars exchange cooperation

List of Pakistani scholars of Soviet studies
Abdul Sattar
Jamsheed Marker
Khurshid Kasuri
Tariq Fatemi

Further reading
Soviet-Pakistan Relations and Post-Soviet Dynamics, 1947–92 Hafeez Malik Springer, 2016 , 9781349105731

References

 
Bilateral relations of the Soviet Union
Soviet Union
History of the foreign relations of Pakistan